Prahlad Kakkar (born 24 March 1950 in Mumbai) is an Indian ad film director, best known for his work on the famous Pepsi TV commercial with Amitabh Bachchan and Sachin Tendulkar. He is the founder and main director for Genesis Film Productions, established in 1977

In 1995 he set up 'Lacadives', a scuba-diving school, along with his wife Mitali Kakar at Kadmat Island, in collaboration with the Govt. of Lakshadweep. He also runs a coffee shop, and Casa Amore, a wine bar and restaurant, set up in Mumbai in 2001. In 2016 he launched School of Branding and Entrepreneurship in Mumbai in association with Subhash Ghai's Whistling Woods International.

Early life
Prahlad Kakar grew up in Mumbai and his father was an army colonel based in Pakistan. His mother is half Burmese and half Marathi.

He did his initial schooling from St. Joseph's Academy, Dehradun. 
In 1966, he passed out from Sainik School, Kunjpura, Karnal, Haryana in 1970. Kakar graduated with Economics (Honors) from Fergusson College, Pune.

Career
Prahlad Kakar joined advertising in 1971, as an Accounts Executive at ASP (Delhi) and after a year, he was transferred to the company's Bombay office. In 1972, he joined the renowned feature director, Shyam Benegal, as an Asst. Director for films such as Ankur, Manthan, and Bhumika.

After training under Shyam Benegal, Mandeep Kakkar and Ravi Uppor, Prahlad Kakar founded Genesis Film Productions in 1977.

Genesis Film Productions is also known for the short film "Bali" made in affiliation with the channel Star One. Prahlad Kakar is also known for his popular Kamasutra ads. After Genesis, Prahlad Kakkar started a restaurant at Prithvi Theatre with Jennifer Kendal.

Prahlad Kakar is the co-founder of ReefWatch Marine Conservation, set up in 1994, which aims at creating marine-life awareness. Prahlad Kakar supports and plays an important role as the Chief Advisor & Trustee of Natura Outdoor Education Trust.

In 1999, Kakar was one of the few Indian directors to direct international commercials for clients like Unilever and Pepsico in Burma, Vietnam, Pakistan, Bangladesh and the Asia Pacific Region. He also started the speciality Tea House in Bombay, the first of its kind in the country. In 2000 he received the prestigious Lifetime Achievement Award from IAAFA  for his contribution to Advertising and Film Art.

Genesis Film Production Pvt. Ltd.
Prahlad Kakar founded Genesis Film Production Pvt. Ltd. in 1977, after having assisted Shyam Benegal, one of India's most renowned filmmakers. Clients of the company include Nestlé, PepsiCo, Brittania, Levers. Prahlad has won several awards for technical excellence, Innovation and creativity in advertising over the years in India. Genesis won both gold and silver awards including campaign of the year for the Pepsi commercials at AAAI in 1996. The public films for Ceat won awards in the New York festival of Advertising. Commercials directed by Prahlad have also been nominated for Lions at Cannes.
Twenty – five years down the line Prahlad Kakar has earned himself a Lifetime Achievement Award by the IAAFA in the year 1999 and has got Genesis the top Production House for two years in a row for years 2003 and 2004 by the Brand Equity. He has helped create campaigns for like “Yehi Hai Right Choice Baby! Aha!” Pepsi Ad, “The Zing Thing” Gold Spot Ad, “2 minutes!” Noodles Ad for Maggi, “Ting Ting Ti Ting” Britannia Biscuits Football Ad, “Zor ka Jhatka” for Limca and “It's different” for Maggi Ketchup.

Offspring and Offshoot
Genesis has given birth to Offspring and Offshoot, production companies that are owned by Mitali Dutt Kakar. Prahlad Kakar remains Principal Director for her production houses as well.

Lacadives
Lacadives is part of the Underwater Federation of India and has established the Indian Scuba Diving Association to ensure the adherence of safety norms in this industry. To further complement its activities Lacadives has set up an NGO called REEF WATCH, whose mission is to create awareness amongst children through workshops and practical training about the fragile Marine Environment.
Lacadives is also the first Dive Centre to have its own Live Aboard, SEA URCHIN, a 55-foot vessel, 150 HP Scania Engine, with sleeping facilities for 8 passengers and four crew. A compressor, de-salination plant, centrally air conditioned, with a 10-foot RIB and a diving platform.

Restaurants
Prahlad Kakar has also been involved in restaurant design. He took on the initiative of reviving the culture of tea in India with a touch of sophistication, a venture which culminated in the Tea Centre, a restaurant designed by him at Churchgate, in association with the Tea Board of India.

In 1985, he ran a Gourmet Restaurant at the Prithvi Theater, Bombay with Jennifer Kendal Kapoor.
In 2001, he started Casa Amore, an exclusive wine bar and restaurant.
Prahlad has also created Papa Pancho for designer Mamta Sekhri. It is one of the few places in Mumbai that offers traditional, home-cooked Punjabi food.
“Sarson da Saaga", Bombay's first " Slow food, Punjabi- home style cooking" opened at IMAX in March 2002.

Personal life
Prahlad Kakar is married to Mitali Dutt Kakar, the owner of the film companies Offspring and Offshoot. They have three sons Arnav, Varun and Anhjin. Prahlad Kakkar is Dyslexic and so are his son’s Arnav and Varun.

Prahlad Kakar has a passion for scuba diving and in 2000 he became a CMAS 2 Star Scuba Diving Instructor. His other interests include gourmet cooking, reading, swimming, snorkeling, squash and horse riding.

Controversy 
Prahlad Kakar made a controversial statement about Amitabh Bachan, he said that Amitabh's name should be in Guiness book of world records because despite 17 flop movies he survived in film industry, Amitabh Bachan's son Abhishek Bachan condemned his comments.

References

 Prahalad Kakar Interview AgencyFAQs
  The Hindu

External links
 
 A blog on Prahlad Kakar
 
 Interview with The Scholars' Avenue, IIT Kharagpur

1950 births
Film directors from Mumbai
Film producers from Mumbai
Indian advertising directors
Underwater divers
Living people
Savitribai Phule Pune University alumni
Indian restaurateurs
Sainik School alumni
People with dyslexia